The 1919 Wimbledon Championships took place on the outdoor grass courts at the All England Lawn Tennis and Croquet Club in Wimbledon, London, United Kingdom. The tournament ran from 23 June until 7 July. It was the 39th staging of the Wimbledon Championships, and the first Grand Slam tennis event of 1919. It was the first Wimbledon championship after a four-year hiatus due to World War I.

Champions

Men's singles

 Gerald Patterson defeated  Norman Brookes  6–3, 7–5, 6–2

Women's singles

 Suzanne Lenglen defeated  Dorothea Lambert Chambers  10–8, 4–6, 9–7

Men's doubles

 Ronald Thomas /  Pat O'Hara Wood defeated  Rodney Heath /  Randolph Lycett, 6–4, 6–2, 4–6, 6–2

Women's doubles

 Suzanne Lenglen /  Elizabeth Ryan defeated  Dorothea Lambert Chambers /  Ethel Larcombe, 4–6, 7–5, 6–3

Mixed doubles

 Randolph Lycett /  Elizabeth Ryan defeated  Albert Prebble /  Dorothea Lambert Chambers, 6–0, 6–0

References

External links
 Official Wimbledon Championships website

 
Wimbledon Championships
Wimbledon Championships
Wimbledon Championships
Wimbledon Championships